is a district located in Tottori Prefecture, Japan.

As of 2003, the district has an estimated population of 65,944 and a density of 109.54 persons per km2. The total area is 602.02 km2.

Towns and villages
Hokuei
Kotoura
Misasa
Yurihama

Mergers
On September 1, 2004, the towns of Tōhaku and Akasaki merged to form the new town of Kotoura.
On October 1, 2004, the towns of Hawai and Tōgō and the village of Tomari merged to form the new town of Yurihama.
On March 22, 2005, the town of Sekigane merged into the city of Kurayoshi.
On October 1, 2005, the towns of Daiei and Hōjō merged to form the new town of Hokuei.

Districts in Tottori Prefecture